The  is a Japanese imperial anthology of waka poetry. It was finished in about 1278 CE, two years after the Retired Emperor Kameyama first ordered it around 1276. It was compiled by Fujiwara no Tameuji (grandson of Fujiwara no Teika, and eldest son of Fujiwara no Tameie; he founded the Nijō poetic clan). It consists of twenty volumes containing 1,461 poems.

See also
 1278 in poetry
 List of Japanese poetry anthologies

References
pg. 485 of Japanese Court Poetry, Earl Miner, Robert H. Brower. 1961, Stanford University Press, LCCN 61-10925

1270s in Japan
13th-century literature